Svenskebukta is a bay at the northern side of Kongsøya of Kong Karls Land, Svalbard. It is located between Kapp Oscar and eastwards towards a point west of Nordaustpynten. Former name variants of the bay are Holmbukta,  and Swedish Yacht Club Bay. The glacier Rundisen debouches into the bay.

References

Bays of Svalbard
Kongsøya